This list is of the Historic Sites of Japan located within the Prefecture of Gifu.

National Historic Sites
As of 17 June 2022, twenty-eight Sites have been designated as being of national significance; the Nakasendō spans the prefectural borders with Nagano.

Prefectural Historic Sites
As of 1 May 2021, one hundred and fifty-six Sites have been designated as being of prefectural importance.

Municipal Historic Sites
As of 1 May 2021, a further eight hundred and eighty-four Sites have been designated as being of municipal importance.

See also

 Cultural Properties of Japan
 List of Places of Scenic Beauty of Japan (Gifu)
 List of Cultural Properties of Japan - paintings (Gifu)
 Gifu Prefectural Museum

References

External links
  Cultural Properties in Gifu Prefecture
  Historic Sites in Gifu Prefecture

Gifu Prefecture
 Gifu